Penicillium coprophilum is a species of the genus of Penicillium which produces roquefortine C, griseofulvin and 
oxaline.

See also
List of Penicillium species

References

coprophilum
Fungi described in 1985